Puncak Jaya (literally "Glorious Peak") or Carstensz Pyramid,  Mount Jayawijaya or Mount Carstensz on the island of New Guinea, with an elevation of , is the highest mountain peak of an island on Earth. The mountain is located in the Sudirman Range of the highlands of Mimika Regency, Central Papua, Indonesia.

Other summits are East Carstensz Peak, Sumantri and Ngga Pulu. Other names include Nemangkawi in the Amungkal language, Carstensz Toppen and Gunung Soekarno. It is also the highest point between the Himalayas and the Andes. Some sources claim Papua New Guinea's Mount Wilhelm, as the highest mountain peak in Oceania, on account of Indonesia being part of Asia (Southeast Asia).

History 
The highlands surrounding the peak were inhabited before European contact, and the peak is known as Nemangkawi in Amungkal.

Dutch discovery 
Puncak Jaya was named "Carstensz Pyramid" after Dutch explorer Jan Carstenszoon, who was the first European who sighted the glaciers on the peak of the mountain on a rare clear day in 1623. The sighting went unverified for over two centuries, and Carstensz was ridiculed in Europe when he said he had seen snow near the equator. It appeared on maps of the time as Sneebergh.

The predecessor of the Lorentz National Park, which encompasses the Carstensz Range, was established in 1919 following the report of this expedition.

Climbing history 

In 1936, the Dutch Carstensz Expedition, unable to establish definitively which of the three summits was the highest, attempted to climb each. Anton Colijn, Jean Jacques Dozy and Frits Wissel reached both the glacier-covered East Carstensz and Ngga Pulu summits on December 5, but, due to bad weather, failed in their attempts to climb the bare Carstensz Pyramid.

The now-highest Carstensz Pyramid summit was not climbed until 1962, by an expedition led by the Austrian mountaineer Heinrich Harrer (of Seven Years in Tibet fame, and climber of the Eiger North Face) with three other expedition members – the New Zealand mountaineer Philip Temple, the Australian rock climber Russell Kippax, and the Dutch patrol officer Albertus (Bert) Huizenga. Temple had previously led an expedition into the area and pioneered the access route to the mountains.

When Indonesia took control of the province in 1963, the peak was renamed Poentja' Soekarno (Simplified Indonesian: Puncak Sukarno) or Sukarno Peak, after the then-President of Indonesia Sukarno; later this was changed to Puncak Jaya due to the subsequent de-Sukarnoization. Puncak means peak or mountain and Jaya means 'victory', 'victorious' or 'glorious'. The name Carstensz Pyramid is still used among mountaineers.

Geology 
Puncak Jaya is the highest point on the Central Range, which was created in the late Miocene Melanesian orogeny,
caused by oblique collision between the Australian and Pacific plates, and is made of middle Miocene limestones.

Access 
Access to the peak requires a government permit. The mountain was closed to tourists and climbers between 1995 and 2005. As of 2006, access is possible through various adventure tourism agencies.

Glaciers 

While Puncak Jaya's peak is free of ice, there are several glaciers on its slopes, including the Carstensz Glacier, West Northwall Firn, East Northwall Firn and the recently vanished Meren Glacier in the Meren Valley (meren is Dutch for "lakes").
Being equatorial, there is little variation in the mean temperature during the year (around ) and the glaciers fluctuate on a seasonal basis only slightly.

The glacier on Puncak Trikora in the Maoke Mountains disappeared completely some time between 1939 and 1962.  Since the 1970s, evidence from satellite imagery indicates the Puncak Jaya glaciers have been retreating rapidly. The Meren Glacier melted away sometime between 1994 and 2000.

An expedition led by paleoclimatologist Lonnie Thompson in 2010 found that the glaciers are disappearing at a rate of  thickness per year and in 2018 they were predicted to vanish in the 2020s.

Climbing 

Puncak Jaya is one of the more demanding climbs in one version of the Seven Summits, despite having the lowest elevation. It is held to have the highest technical rating, though not the greatest physical demands of that list's ascents.

The standard route to climb the peak from its base camp is up the north face and along the summit ridge, which is all hard rock surface. Despite the large mine, the area is highly inaccessible to hikers and the general public. The standard route to access base camp as of 2013 is to fly into the nearest major town with an airport, Timika, and then take a small aircraft over the mountain range and onto an unimproved runway at one of the local villages far down from the peak. It is then typically a five-day hike via the Jungle route to the base camp through very dense rainforest and with regular rainfall, making the approach probably the "most miserable" of the Seven Summits. Rain during most days of the hike inbound and out are not uncommon. Unlike the other Seven Summits, if one sustains an injury on the inbound hike, there is little or no ability to get rescued via helicopter. Anyone injured must evacuate by foot over very difficult and slippery terrain.

The descent from the peak's base camp can take three to four days. Anecdotally, it appears most injuries occur during the descent due to a combination of exhaustion and difficulty controlling hiking speed on the wet and slippery terrain.

An additional complication is relatively common work strikes by the climbing porters that accompany most expeditions, occasionally halting their work to demand (and usually receive) higher pay before agreeing to continue. The one-day summit bid is technically challenging for those with little rock climbing experience, and it can be quite cold with temperatures at or below freezing near the summit. Patches of snow sometimes appear on the route up or on the ropes of the Tyrolean traverse just below the summit.

See also 

Eight Summits
List of elevation extremes by country
List of highest mountains of New Guinea
List of Southeast Asian mountains
Seven Summits

References

External links 

 "Mountains of the Indonesian Archipelago"- Peaklist.org
 Racing Time on Oceania's Highest Peak by The Earth Institute
 Puncak Jaya on Peakware 
 Puncak Jaya on Peakbagger
 Carstensz Expedition Report – 90+ Photos
 Aerial photos from the Puncak Jaya region

Mountains of Western New Guinea
Seven Summits
Highest points of countries
Four-thousanders of New Guinea